Jean Carn, also spelled Jean Carne (born Sarah Jean Perkins; March 15, 1947) is an American jazz and pop singer. In mid career, she added a final e to her name. Carn is a vocalist credited with a five octave vocal range.

Biography
Carn was born Sarah Jean Perkins in Columbus, Georgia. At the age of four, she became a member of her church choir.

Carn planned on furthering her studies at Juilliard School of Music in New York City when she met and married jazz pianist Doug Carn (the couple later divorced) and became a featured vocalist in his jazz fusion band. The couple based themselves in Los Angeles, California, where Carn did four early albums with her husband, Infant Eyes, Spirit of the New Land, Revelation and Adam's Apple on Black Jazz/Ovation.

In 1976, Carn was signed to Kenneth Gamble and Leon Huff's Philadelphia International Records. She released her debut album Jean Carn in 1976. The debut single "Free Love" went to number 23 R&B. In June 1978, her second album for the label, Happy to Be With You, was released. It included the hit single "Don't Let It Go to Your Head".

Carn's third Philadelphia International album When I Find You Love was issued in 1979. "My Love Don't Come Easy" peaked at number 43 on the R&B chart. The album included the Jerry Butler penned track Was that all it was? which, despite not charting, was a big disco hit in the UK clubs.

At this time Carn moved from the Philadelphia International label to the subsidiary TSOP imprint for her 1981 album Sweet and Wonderful. Carn moved to Motown Records in 1982, making her label debut with the album Trust Me. The single "If You Don't Know Me By Now," a cover of the Harold Melvin and the Blue Notes hit with backing vocals by The Temptations, went to number 49 on the R&B chart.

By 1986, Carn signed to Omni Records. Closer Than Close, produced by saxophonist Grover Washington Jr. went to number one on the R&B charts. Her 1988 album You're a Part of Me was her only release on Atlantic Records.

In 2014, Carn was honored with a lifetime Achievement Award present by the National R&B Music Society in Philadelphia, PA.

In 2020, Carn was one of the many performers aboard The Soul Train Cruise.

On October 16, 2022, Carne's life was featured on the documentary TV One series, Unsung.

Discography

Studio albums

Compilations
 The Best of Jean Carn & The Best of The Jones Girls (1998, Recall 2cd)
 Closer Than Close: The Best of Jean Carn (1999, Philadelphia International/The Right Stuff)
 Collaborations (2002, Expansion)
  Don't Let It Go to Your Head: The Anthology (2018, SoulMusic)

Singles

DVD
 Jean Carn & Friends: The Sound of Philadelphia: Live in Europe (Expansion, 2005)
  Ladies Night Out—Live (Steppin Muzak, 2007, also available as a CD)

References

External links
Jean Carn on Soul Walking
Jean Carn at Soulful Tale

1947 births
Living people
20th-century African-American women singers
American dance musicians
American jazz singers
American soul singers
Singers with a five-octave vocal range
Motown artists
Musicians from Columbus, Georgia
Philadelphia International Records artists
Black Jazz Records artists
Ovation Records artists
21st-century American women singers
21st-century American singers
Jazz musicians from Pennsylvania
21st-century African-American women singers